

Caralue Bluff Conservation Park is a protected area in the Australian state of South Australia located on the Eyre Peninsula in the gazetted locality of Caralue about  south-west of the town centre in Kimba.

The land now within the conservation park first received protected area status on 9 December 1993 as a conservation reserve under the Crown Lands Act 1929 as the ‘Caralue Bluff Conservation Reserve‘ in respect to the following land in the cadastral unit of the Hundred of Caralue - "allotment 2 of Deposited Plan No. 37135". This land was formerly a part of the 'Caralue Bluff Water Conservation Reserve'. On 6 September 2012, the land forming the conservation reserve and an adjacent parcel of land were constituted as the ‘Caralue Bluff Conservation Park’ under the state's National Parks and Wildlife Act 1972.

Its name was ultimately derived from Caralue Bluff, a feature located to the south-west of the conservation park.

The conservation park is classified as an IUCN Category VI protected area.

See also
Protected areas of South Australia

References

External links
Entry for Caralue Bluff Conservation Park on the Protected Planet website

Conservation parks of South Australia
Protected areas established in 1993
1993 establishments in Australia
Eyre Peninsula